Kalamunda Road is a minor arterial road linking the historic suburb of South Guildford with the Darling Scarp suburb of Kalamunda, in Perth, Western Australia.

It serves as a major access road for Perth Airport, and provides the foothills suburbs with access to the Perth central business district.

Route
Beginning at the historical and now bypassed Great Eastern Highway in South Guildford, the road passes through a light industrial area, and meets the Great Eastern Highway Bypass, which provides access to Perth City and Midland.

It then passes by Perth Airport and Guildford Cemetery, before passing through the foothills suburbs of High Wycombe and Maida Vale. After meeting Roe Highway, it is allocated State Route 41, and is dual carriageway for this section between the highway and Hawtin Road. It then reverts to single carriageway and ascends the Darling Scarp. This section is colloquially known as Kalamunda Hill. It ends in the Kalamunda town centre.

Major intersections

All of the below intersections are controlled by traffic lights, except for the Newburn Road and the terminus in Kalamunda, which are controlled by roundabouts.
  Great Eastern Highway (National route 1), South Guildford
  Great Eastern Highway Bypass (National Highway 94), South Guildford and Perth Airport
  Abernethy Road (State Route 55), High Wycombe
 Newburn Road, High Wycombe
  Roe Highway (State Route 3), High Wycombe and Maida Vale
  State Route 41 north-western terminus at Roe Highway
 Gooseberry Hill Road northeast / Hawtin Road southwest, Maida Vale
  Canning Road (State Route 41) south / Stirk Street east / Headingly Road north (no entry), Kalamunda

See also

Notes

Roads in Perth, Western Australia
Kalamunda, Western Australia